The tawny-rumped tyrannulet (Phyllomyias uropygialis) is a species of bird in the family Tyrannidae. It is found in Argentina, Bolivia, Colombia, Ecuador, Peru, and Venezuela. Its natural habitats are subtropical or tropical moist montane forests and heavily degraded former forest.

References

tawny-rumped tyrannulet
Birds of the Northern Andes
tawny-rumped tyrannulet
Taxonomy articles created by Polbot